Yorobougoula is a village and seat of the commune of Gouanan in the Cercle of Yanfolila in the Sikasso Region of southern Mali.

References

Populated places in Sikasso Region